Benetton Rugby, also known as Benetton Treviso ( or ), is an Italian professional rugby union team based in Treviso, Veneto competing in the United Rugby Championship, the European Rugby Challenge Cup and European Champions Cup. Treviso rugby team was founded in 1932 and has won 15 Italian national championships. The team has been owned by the Benetton clothing company since 1979. Treviso have competed in the United Rugby Championship (formerly the Pro14 and Pro12) since 2010, and have previously competed in the Italian domestic championship.

Treviso have supplied many players to the Italian national team, such as Alessandro Zanni and Leonardo Ghiraldini. Conversely, several notable foreign internationals have played for Treviso, including Rugby World Cup winners Craig Green, John Kirwan and Michael Lynagh. The President of Treviso Rugby is Amerino Zatta. Since 1982, the club has also had a women's team, known as Red Panthers, which has won 16 national championships.

History

Amateur era: 1932–1995
Treviso rugby team was founded in 1932. The club won its first honour when it took the 1956 Italian premiership. Benetton Treviso won its first Italian Cup in 1970 and in 1978 won the Italian premiership again. The year after Benetton became the main sponsor, the team's name became "Benetton Rugby Treviso". Treviso won the domestic premiership in 1983, then again in 1989 and in the 1992 season.

Professional era: 1995–present
Benetton Treviso Rugby turned professional after 1995. They dominated the Italian league from 1997 until 2010, winning the championship 10 times (1997, 1998, 1999, 2001, 2003, 2004, 2006, 2007, 2009 and 2010) during those 14 seasons and twice finishing second. They also won the Italian Cup in 1998.

Benetton Treviso has competed in the Heineken Cup competition almost every year since the competition began in 1995 along with the professional era. Benetton Treviso competed in the inaugural 1995–96 Heineken Cup, winning one game and losing one. The following season they played four matches, winning one game. In the 1998–99 Heineken Cup, they won three games. Benetton Treviso spent the 2000–01 and 2002–03 seasons in the European Challenge Cup, but have appeared in the Heineken Cup in each season since then. They won half of their games during the 2004–05 Heineken Cup, but won only one match in the following four seasons (at Newport Gwent Dragons in 2007). In the 2009–10 Heineken Cup opener, they defeated reigning French Top 14 champions Perpignan 9–8 in Treviso.

Following the 2009–10 season, Treviso left the Italian domestic competition and in 2010–11 was one of two Italian teams to join the Celtic League to play against clubs from Ireland, Wales and Scotland. The new league was to be known as the Pro12. Both Italian teams were guaranteed places annually into the Heineken Cup, which had previously been awarded to the two top teams in the domestic Italian National Championship of Excellence.  An agreement had been reached in early March 2010 to allow two Italian teams a place in the Celtic League. In 2010, it was proposed that Aironi and a new team, Praetorians Roma, would join, but Treviso were nominated instead. Treviso and a combination of Duchi Nord-Ovest rugby clubs could not agree to form one regional representative club and lost out in the first round of bidding. However, Pretorians Roma failed to satisfy financial criteria, and Treviso instead joined the Pro12.

Treviso finished their first two season in the Pro12 (2010–11 and 2011–12) in 10th place, while in the 2012–13 season they finished 7th with 50 points. In the next three seasons, Treviso performed poorly, ending 11th, 11th and 12th out of twelve teams.
After that, a new head coach was engaged for the 2016/2017 season, the New Zealander Kieran Crowley. The former All Black formed a new coaching team with two ex-Italian internationals, Marco Bortolami and Fabio Ongaro. Treviso finished the season in 10th place.

In 2017/2018, the championship was joined by two South Africans teams, becoming the Pro14, and was divided into two conferences. This season Treviso nearly reached the European Rugby Champions Cup play-offs, ending 5th in the conference with 55 points. For first time since Treviso joined this league the club has been able to record more wins than losses (11 against 10).

Ahead of the 2017/18 season, Benetton Rugby Treviso was renamed Benetton Rugby. From 2022/23 season, he instituted an Academy Under 23 and a territorial Academy Under 19.

Honours
 Italian Championship:
 Champions: 15 (1956, 1978, 1983, 1989, 1992, 1997, 1998, 1999, 2001, 2003, 2004, 2006, 2007, 2009, 2010)
 Coppa Italia:
 Champions: 4 (1970, 1998, 2005, 2010)
 Supercoppa d'Italia: 
 Champions: 2 (2006, 2009)
 Pro14 Rainbow Cup
 Champions: (2021)

Current standings

Season records

Celtic League / Pro12

Pro14

Pro14 Rainbow Cup

Heineken Cup / European Rugby Champions Cup

European Rugby Challenge Cup

Stadium 

The team play at the Stadio Comunale di Monigo in Treviso, 4 km northwest of the city centre. The stadium has two covered stands and a capacity of 6,700.

Staff and coaching team
The staff for the 2022–23 season is: 

 Sports director – Antonio Pavanello
 Head coach – Marco Bortolami
 Assistant coach – Fabio Ongaro
 Assistant coach – Calum MacRae
 Assistant coach – Andrea Masi
 Assistant coach – Julian Salvi
 Assistant coach – Alessandro Troncon
 Team Manager – Enrico Ceccato
 Trainer – Jim Molony − Alberto Botter – Mario Disetti – Giorgio Da Lozzo – Riccardo Ton – Alessandro Zanni - Alberto Antonelli
 Video analyst – Nicola Gatto − Mattia Geromel

Current squad

Additional player squad

Selected former players

Italian players
Former players who have played for Benetton and have caps for Italy

 Tommaso Allan
 Orazio Arancio
 Enrico Bacchin
 Robert Barbieri
 Marco Barbini
 Alberto Benettin
 Tommaso Benvenuti
 Mauro Bergamasco
 Valerio Bernabò
 Stefano Bettarello
 Callum Braley
 Luca Bigi
 Lucio Boccaletto
 Tobias Botes
 Giorgio Bronzini
 Dean Budd
 Kris Burton
 Michele Campagnaro
 Gonzalo Canale
 Carlo Checchinato
 Lorenzo Cittadini
 Oscar Collodo
 Walter Cristofoletto
 Mauro Dal Sie
 Denis Dallan
 Manuel Dallan
 Santiago Dellapè
 Benjamin de Jager
 Andrea De Marchi
 Paul Derbyshire
 Alberto Di Bernardo
 Raffaele Dolfato
 Piermassimiliano Dotto
 Angelo Esposito
 Hame Faiva
 Gianluca Faliva
 Simone Favaro
 Ignacio Fernandez Rouyet
 Ivan Francescato
 Marco Fuser
 Ezio Galon
 Paolo Garbisi
 Gonzalo Garcia
 Julian Gardner
 Ornel Gega
 Leonardo Ghiraldini
 Mark Giacheri
 Edoardo Gori
 Giovanni Grespan
 Andrea Gritti
 Jayden Hayward
 Tommaso Iannone
 Monty Ioane
 Alberto Lucchese 
 Andrea Marcato 
 Ramiro Martínez 
 Francesco Mazzariol 
 Nicola Mazzucato 
 Luke McLean 
 Ian McKinley 
 Francesco Minto
 Jean-François Montauriol
 Luca Morisi
 Alessandro Moscardi
 Ludovico Nitoglia
 David Odiete
 Fabio Ongaro
 Scott Palmer
 Sergio Parisse
 Antonio Pavanello
 Enrico Pavanello
 Mario Pavin
 Massimiliano Perziano
 Simon Picone
 Giancarlo Pivetta
 Walter Pozzebon
 Andrea Pratichetti
 Franco Properzi
 Nicola Quaglio
 Iliesa Ratuva Tavuyara
 Marco Riccioni
 Michele Rizzo
 Guido Rossi
 Leonardo Sarto
 Stefano Saviozzi
 Franco Sbaraglini
 Diego Scaglia
 Fabio Semenzato
 Michele Sepe
 Alberto Sgarbi
 Andrea Sgorlon
 Luca Sperandio
 Tito Tebaldi
 Giulio Toniolatti
 Moreno Trevisiol
 Alessandro Troncon
 Giorgio Troncon
 Corniel van Zyl
 Tommaso Visentin
 Manoa Vosawai
 Alessandro Zanni
 Gianni Zanon
 Matteo Zanusso
 Sergio Zorzi

Overseas players
Former players who have played for Benetton and have caps for their Representative Team

I Dogi

Treviso is an executive member of the historical territorial representative of I Dogi (the Doges) that have recovered in 2015 and represents several clubs in Veneto and Friuli Venezia Giulia. Currently no provision is made for a selection Seniors who take the field with the shirt of The Doges: to represent its brand and colors are at this stage the representative under-14, under-16 male and female under-18 male and female managed by Veneto Regional Committee. May occur during the right conditions, there is still the desire to be able to field, even if it is currently not a priority.

In the past, Dogi was a historical invitational team that included the best players of Triveneto, area of Italy in which this sport is very widespread. The team was founded on 17 December 1973 in Treviso, and played its last game on 17 November 1993. In twenty years they played 22 games with teams of international level, collecting 15 victories. The selection shirt was red, with golden edges.

See also

 Pro14
 Heineken Cup
 European Challenge Cup
 Top12
 Coppa Italia

References

External links
 

 
Rugby clubs established in 1932
Benetton Group
United Rugby Championship teams